Sherman Nathaniel Copelin, Jr. (born August 1943), is an American politician and businessman from his native New Orleans, Louisiana.

The son of a funeral director, Copelin graduated from St. Augustine High School and then became active in student politics at historically black Dillard University, where he became student body president. He was hired to serve as an aide in the administration of Mayor Victor Schiro in 1968. In the 1970s, he and Don Hubbard emerged as the leaders of the black political organization called SOUL (Southern Organization for Unified Leadership). SOUL's effectiveness in rallying the support of  African American voters for candidates like Louisiana Governor Edwin Edwards and New Orleans Mayor Moon Landrieu made him a powerful figure in New Orleans and Louisiana politics.

In the 1970s Copelin headed Superdome Services, Inc., a politically connected company contracted by the Landrieu administration to provide janitorial and security services for the then new Louisiana Superdome. Scandal emerged when Copelin was accused of receiving payoffs from companies seeking to obtain contracts from City Hall.

In 1986, Copelin was elected to the Louisiana House of Representatives from New Orleans's Lower Ninth Ward. He was subsequently the Speaker Pro Tempore. Success in business dealings led Copelin to move to Eastern New Orleans outside his district.  The residency issue became an issue in his re-election campaign, and he was defeated in 1999 by the Reverend Leonard Lucas.

Copelin ran unsuccessfully in the New Orleans mayoral election of 1994.

Copelin is currently the head of the New Orleans East Business Association, and since Hurricane Katrina has publicly opposed the construction of new apartment complexes in New Orleans East.

Sources 

Bridges, Tyler.  Bad Bet on the Bayou:  The Rise of Gambling in Louisiana and the Fall of Governor Edwin Edwards.   Farrar, Straus and Giroux, 2001.

DuBos, Clancy.  "SOUL on the Ropes."   Gambit Weekly.  March 20, 2001.  

1943 births
Living people
Politicians from New Orleans
African-American state legislators in Louisiana
Activists for African-American civil rights
Democratic Party members of the Louisiana House of Representatives
American funeral directors
Businesspeople from New Orleans
21st-century African-American people
20th-century African-American people